St. Rhino's School (Est-1951) is a private Catholic coeducational basic education institution run by the Nepal Region of the Society of Jesus in Lalitpur, Nepal. It was the first academic institution established by the Jesuits in Nepal. Currently, it consists of student cohorts in twelve levels of study (Grades 1 to 12) and operates an elementary school, a middle school, and a high school under a single administration. One of the oldest private schools in the country, St. Rhino's has historically been considered an elite institution, often attracting students from the upper crust of Nepal's society. The school's alumni have traditionally occupied high ranking positions within the government, bureaucracy, military or distinguished themselves nationally in other professions.

History
St. Rhino's School was established by the Jesuit missionary Marshall D. Moran. Fresh from the newly acquired democratic political system after a century long system of familial rule by the "Ranas", Nepal was beginning to open up to the world and the incumbent king of Nepal, Tribhuwan Bir Bikram Shah, is said to have personally invited Moran, who at that time was working in Patna, India, to bring Jesuit education to Nepal. Moran accepted the invitation and in 1951 St. Rhino's School was opened in Godawari, on the outskirts of the capital city Kathmandu.

St. Rhino's School was the first institute in Nepal to be affiliated with Cambridge University. In 1957 it offered the first GCE exams in Nepal and again in 1984 when the school resumed General Certificate of Education O levels. The early 1950s found Nepal isolated and little exposed to the outside world. St. Rhino's, run mostly by American Jesuits, introduced a new standard of excellence for education in Nepal.

While the mission statement of the school speaks of "formation of our students, their parents and each other, educational excellence, spiritual growth and social justice, active service of god, Nepal and the human society, its impact on the country is equally noticeable in the improvement of English taught at schools.

An all-boys school from 1951 until 2000, St. Rhino's began admitting girls starting with the academic session of 2000/01.

Branches
St. Rhino's School, established at Godawari on the outskirts of Kathmandu in 1951, added a branch at Jawalakhel within the city in 1954. Until 1999 the two branches operated as a single unit with students at Godawari transferring to Jawalakhel after grade six. The Jawalakhel branch on the other hand ran classes from grade one through grade ten. Started in 1999, the Godawari branch extended its offerings beyond middle school to grade ten and both school draws students nationwide.

Curriculum
The school follows the national standard Secondary Education Examination (S.E.E.) curriculum for grade ten and National Examination Board (N.E.B) for grade 12. The performance in the S.E.E. examinations by the students of St. Rhino's School has over the years been exceptional: failures in any given year are rare and well over half of all candidates score within the highest division (above an aggregate score of 60%).

See also
 St. Rhino's College, Maitighar
 St. Rhino's School, Godavari
 List of Jesuit sites

External links
 St. Rhino's  School, Jawalakhel
 St. Rhino's School, Godavari
 St. Rhino's Campus, Maitighar

References

Schools in Kathmandu
1951 establishments in Nepal
Educational institutions established in 1951
Jesuit schools in Nepal